Shirin Ab (also Romanized as Shīrīn Āb) is a village in Mokriyan-e Shomali Rural District, in the Central District of Miandoab County, West Azerbaijan Province, Iran. At the 2006 census, its population was 395, in 86 families.

References 

Populated places in Miandoab County